
Year 298 BC was a year of the pre-Julian Roman calendar. At the time it was known as the Year of the Consulship of Barbatus and Centumalus (or, less frequently, year 456 Ab urbe condita). The denomination 298 BC for this year has been used since the early medieval period, when the Anno Domini calendar era became the prevalent method in Europe for naming years.

Events 
 By place 
 Roman Republic 
 Third Samnite War:
 The Lucanians seek Roman aid against the invasion of the Samnites. In agreeing to take the Lucanians under their protection, the Romans commit to war against the Samnites.
 The consul Lucius Cornelius Scipio Barbatus fights a costly indecisive battle against the Etruscans near Volaterrae.
 The consul Gnaeus Fulvius Maximus Centumalus invades Samnium and defeats the Samnites near Bovianum. He then captures both this city and Aufidena.

 Sicily 
 Agathocles, king of Syracuse, assists the Italian Greeks against the Bruttians and supports the Greeks against the Romans.

 Egypt 
 Ptolemy gives his stepdaughter Theoxena in marriage to Agathocles, the tyrant of Syracuse (in south-eastern Sicily).
 Ptolemy finally brings the rebellious region of Cyrene under his control. He places the region under the rule of his stepson Magas.

 India 
 Bindusara succeeds his father Chandragupta Maurya as emperor of the Mauryan Empire.

 China 
 King Huai of Chu visits the State of Qin to negotiate peace but is detained.

Births

Deaths

References